South Carolina v. Baker, 485 U.S. 505 (1988), was a United States Supreme Court case in which the Court ruled that section 310(b)(1) of the Tax Equity and Fiscal Responsibility Act of 1982 (TEFRA) does not violate the Tenth Amendment to the United States Constitution.

Background
TEFRA continued the federal tax exemption for state bond interest as long as the bond is registered, with each seller and buyer being recorded for audit purposes. Anonymous bearer bonds, which often were used in money laundering, were no longer exempt, however. South Carolina sued to have the federal tax advantage restored for all their bonds.

Decision
The Court also ruled that a nondiscriminatory federal tax on the interest earned on state bonds does not violate the intergovernmental tax immunity doctrine, which permitted the federal taxation of interest income on bonds issued by state governments in the United States. The Supreme Court stated that the contrary decision of the Court in the case of Pollock v. Farmers' Loan & Trust Co. (1895) had been "effectively overruled by subsequent case law."

Sources

External links

United States Supreme Court decisions that overrule a prior Supreme Court decision
United States Supreme Court cases
United States Supreme Court cases of the Rehnquist Court
United States taxation and revenue case law
United States Tenth Amendment case law
1988 in United States case law
Government bonds
Taxation in South Carolina